Job Barnard (June 8, 1844 – February 28, 1923) was an Associate Justice of the Supreme Court of the District of Columbia.

Education and career
Born in Porter County, Indiana, Barnard served in the United States Army during the American Civil War from 1861 to 1865, where he was a First Sergeant in Company K, 73rd Indiana Infantry Regiment. He then received a Bachelor of Laws from the University of Michigan Law School in 1867. He was in private practice in Crown Point, Indiana from 1867 to 1873. He was an assistant clerk for the Supreme Court of the District of Columbia from 1873 to 1876, returning to private practice in Washington, D.C. from 1876 to 1899, and teaching as a professor at Georgetown Law.

Federal judicial service
Barnard received a recess appointment from President William McKinley on October 1, 1899, to an Associate Justice seat on the Supreme Court of the District of Columbia (now the United States District Court for the District of Columbia) vacated by Associate Justice Walter Smith Cox. He was nominated to the same position by President McKinley on December 11, 1899. He was confirmed by the United States Senate on December 19, 1899, and received his commission the same day. His service terminated on June 8, 1914, due to his retirement.

Death
Barnard died on February 28, 1923, in Washington, D.C. He is buried at Arlington National Cemetery.

Honor
Barnard Elementary School in Washington, D.C. is named in Barnard's honor.

References

Sources

External links
Arlington National Cemetery

1844 births
1923 deaths
Judges of the United States District Court for the District of Columbia
United States federal judges appointed by William McKinley
Union Army non-commissioned officers
University of Michigan Law School alumni
People from Porter County, Indiana
People from Crown Point, Indiana
Burials at Arlington National Cemetery